Gastón Etlis and Martín Rodríguez were the defending champions, but did not participate together this year.  Etlis did not participate this year.  Rodríguez partnered Fernando González and they won the title, defeating Lucas Arnold and Mariano Hood 6–4, 6–4 in the final.

Seeds

Draw

Draw

External links
 Draw

Doubles